Ruby is a surname. Notable people with the surname include:

 Arthur Ruby (1915–2004), Canadian founding partner of accounting firm Ruby Stein and Wagner, WWII RCAF Airman, and instrumental in development of Rosemere, Quebec.
 Clayton Ruby (1942–2022), Canadian lawyer and activist
 Dan Ruby (born 1964), American politician
 Dave Ruby, American actor
 Ethan Ruby, American businessman
 Georg Ruby (born 1953), German musician and composer
 Harry Ruby (1895–1974), American songwriter and screenwriter
 Israel Ruby, American attorney and politician
 Jack Ruby (1911–1967), American businessman and murderer of presidential assassin Lee Harvey Oswald
 Jacob Ruby (born 1992), Canadian football player
 Jake Ruby (born 2000), Canadian soccer player
 Jay Ruby (1935–2022), American anthropologist and academic
 Joe Ruby (1933–2020), American animator, writer, television producer, and music editor
 Karine Ruby (1978–2009), French snowboarder
 Laura Ruby, American author
 Lloyd Ruby (1928–2009), American race car driver
 Pierre Ruby (born 1932), French cyclist
 Sam Ruby, American software developer
 Sterling Ruby (born 1972), American artist 
 Josh Ruby,  accomplished American DJ 
 Christy Ruby, American business owner

References
https://montrealgazette.remembering.ca/obituary/arthur-ruby-1066325583